Halfeti is a town and district on the east bank of the river Euphrates in Şanlıurfa Province in Turkey,  from the city of Şanlıurfa.  Population (2000 census) 33,467 (of which 2,608 were in the town of Halfeti, the majority being in the surrounding villages).

Most of the villages were submerged in the 1990s under the waters behind the dam on the Euphrates at Birecik. The town was therefore moved to the village of Karaotlak.

Halfeti was the subject of an internet urban legend wherein the town was the only location on Earth where black roses grew.

Post-dam settlement

As part of the Southeastern Anatolia Project, aka GAP, several dams were constructed in the area and surrounding regions as part of a larger agricultural and economic initiative by the Turkish Government. The town of Halfeti was among those settlements, ancient and contemporary, that would remain under the rising water levels of the local dams and rivers following the execution of the GAP.

Until the area was flooded in 1999, the people lived from fishing in the Euphrates and farming on the riverbank, especially growing pistachios. Some buildings, including the jail, were pulled down and rebuilt in the new town. The old town of Halfeti is only partially submerged and is now a local tourist attraction, especially for ferry trips to visit the ruins of the nearby fortress of Rumkale. The countryside is also attractive, although the green valley of the past is now underwater.

Opposite Halfeti stood the village of Kale Meydanı, which was also submerged, but the large landowners house was taken and reconstructed in the grounds of Harran University.

Villages and quarters

Halfeti is composed of the following villages and urban quarters, each headed by a mukhtar:

Politics 
In the 31 March 2019 local elections, the candidate of the Justice and Development Party (AKP), Şeref Albayrak, was elected mayor with 54.92% of the votes. His first rival Peoples' Democratic Party's candidate Abdurrahman Çiftçi obtained 37.56% of votes. The current Kaymakam is Selami Korkutata.

Notable people 
 Abdullah Öcalan (born 1949), Kurdish politician , nationalist and founder of the Kurdish Workers Party.
 Müslüm Gürses (1953–2013), musician
 Osman Öcalan (1958–2021), Kurdish military commander
 Dilek Öcalan (born 1987), politician

References

Populated places in Şanlıurfa Province
Populated places on the Euphrates River
Districts of Şanlıurfa Province
Kurdish settlements in Turkey
Cittaslow